Blue Gold: World Water Wars is a 2008 documentary film directed, co-produced, and co-written by Sam Bozzo, based on the book Blue Gold: The Fight to Stop the Corporate Theft of the World’s Water by Maude Barlow and Tony Clarke.

It was produced by Mark Achbar and Si Litvinoff and was narrated by Malcolm McDowell. The film was first screened on October 9, 2008, at the Vancouver International Film Festival.

Synopsis
Blue Gold: World Water Wars examines environmental and political implications of the planet's dwindling water supply, and posits that wars in the future will be fought over water.  The film also highlights some success stories of water activists around the world.

Critical reception and awards
Audience award for Best Environmental Film at the Vancouver International Film Festival
Ecology Now! award at the European Independent Film Festival
Jury prize for best documentary feature at the Newport Beach Film Festival

See also
Water crisis
Water politics
Water privatization

References

External links
 
 

2008 films
2008 documentary films
American documentary films
Documentary films about water and the environment
Films about activists
Films about water scarcity
2000s English-language films
2000s American films
English-language documentary films